Vítor Martins (born October 22, 1944) is a Brazilian songwriter, known for several hits in Brazil and internationally. Most of these were composed with Ivan Lins (born 1945), with whom Martins began working in the early 1970s. Together, they founded the national record company Velas in 1991.

Compositions
These compositions are with Ivan Lins unless noted. Some of these have English translations, and been recorded and published with various artists internationally.

References

Brazilian songwriters
1944 births
Living people